Pierre et Jean is a naturalist or psycho-realist work written by Guy de Maupassant in Étretat in his native Normandy between June and September 1887. This was Maupassant's shortest novel. It appeared in three instalments in the Nouvelle Revue and then in volume form in 1888, together with the essay “Le Roman” [“The Novel”]. Pierre et Jean is a realist work, notably so by the subjects on which it treats, including knowledge of one's heredity (whether one is a legitimate son or a bastard), the bourgeoisie, and the problems stemming from money.

Plot
Pierre and Jean are the sons of Gérôme Roland, a jeweller who has retired to Le Havre, and his wife Louise. Pierre works as a doctor, and Jean is a lawyer. It recounts the story of a middle-class French family whose lives are changed when Léon Maréchal, a deceased family friend, leaves his inheritance to Jean. This provokes Pierre to doubt the fidelity of his mother and the legitimacy of his brother. Pierre discovers that his theories about his brother's illegitimacy are correct when he discovers his mother has hid and lied about an incriminating portrait of Maréchal and his love letters to her, some of which she burns when she realizes Pierre is learning of her past infidelity. This investigation sparks violent reactions in Pierre, whose external appearance vis-a-vis his mother visibly changes. In his anguish, most notably shown during family meals, he tortures her with allusions to the past that he has now uncovered. Meanwhile, Jean's career and love life improve over the course of the novel while Pierre's life gets significantly worse. Provoked by his brother's accusations of jealousy, Pierre reveals to Jean what he has learned. However, unlike Pierre, Jean offers his mother love and protection. The novel closes with Pierre's departure on an oceanliner. Thus the novel is organised around the unwelcome appearance of a truth (Jean's illegitimacy), its suppression for the sake of family continuity and the acquisition of wealth, and the expulsion from the family of the legitimate son.

Preface 
An essay titled The Novel (Le Roman) precedes the story. Maupassant discusses the general form of the novel, without advocating for any school of writing. Instead, he declares that a single definition can never be reached for what a novel is due to the many forms in which it can appear (works such as Don Quixote, The Three Musketeers, and Madame Bovary are listed to illustrate the diversity of the form.)

Maupassant advocates for a writer's freedom to write about a topic that suits their character, and urges critics to judge writing solely based on its artistic value, and whether it fulfills its aims. 

Maupassant also stresses that a novel should not be a perfect imitation of life, but a reconstruction using words, characters, and a narrative. A writer, he believes, should carefully pick the appropriate moments of their characters' lives in order to create a story, discarding the numerous day-to-day occurrences which serve no use to this purpose.

Adaptations
The novel was adapted into the 1943 French film Pierre and Jean, the Indian film Astitva and into the 2015 American drama film Peter and John.

References

External links

 
Free audiobook : Pierre et Jean (in French)
Free text : Pierre & Jean (in English)
 

1888 French novels
Novels by Guy de Maupassant
Naturalist novels
Psychological novels
Novels set in 19th-century France
Novels first published in serial form
Le Havre
Adultery in novels
Novels set in Normandy
French novels adapted into films